Tatyana Ivanovna Dyakonova (born 22 April 1970, Osh, Kirghiz Soviet Socialist Republic) is a Russian politician and a deputy of the 8th State Duma. From 2018 to 2019, she worked as an assistant to the Minister of Economic Development Maxim Oreshkin. In 2019–2021, she headed the Department of Personnel Policy and Personnel Development of the Ministry of Economic Development. Since 2021, she has served as a deputy of the 8th State Duma from the Lipetsk Oblast constituency. She ran with the United Russia.

Tatyana Dyakonova is one of the winners of the prestigious competition  initiated by the "Russia – Land of Opportunities" platform launched in 2017 by Vladimir Putin.

She is one of the members of the State Duma the United States Treasury sanctioned on 24 March 2022 in response to the 2022 Russian invasion of Ukraine.

References

1970 births
Living people
United Russia politicians
21st-century Russian politicians
Eighth convocation members of the State Duma (Russian Federation)
Russian individuals subject to the U.S. Department of the Treasury sanctions
Immanuel Kant Baltic Federal University alumni